Amargarh is a city in the Malerkotla district of Punjab state in India.  It is located at main road (Malerkotla - Patiala) which is nearly 60 kilometers far from Patiala. The City is administrated by Municipal Council. Presently, Smt. Jaspal Kaur is the President of Nagar Panchayat Amargarh of the city.

Demography 
As of 2011, Amargarh has a total number of 293 houses and population of 1451 of which 740 included are males while 711 are females according to the report published by Census India in 2011. The literacy rate of Amargarh is 78.36%, higher than the state average of 75.84%. The population of children under the age of 6 years is 134 which is 9.24% of total population of Amargarh, and child sex ratio is approximately 861 as compared to Punjab state average of 846.

Most of the people are from Schedule Caste which constitutes 46.86% of total population in Amargarh. The town does not have any Schedule Tribe population so far.

As per the report published by Census India in 2011, 432 people were engaged in work activities out of the total population of Amargarh which includes 408 males and 24 females. According to census survey report 2011, 98.15% workers describe their work as main work and 1.85% workers are involved in Marginal activity providing livelihood for less than 6 months.

Education 
The City has a Punjabi medium, co-ed upper primary school founded in 1977. The schools provide mid-day meal which prepared in School premises as per Indian Midday Meal Scheme. The school provide free education to children between the ages of 6 and 14 as per Right of Children to Free and Compulsory Education Act.

Colleges

Transport 

See also 
List of villages in India

References

External links 
 Tourism of Punjab
 Census of Punjab
 Locality Based PINCode

Cities and towns in Malerkotla district